Sandrine Morand (born 11 April 1979) is a French female curler.

At the national level, she is a seven-time French women's champion curler (2000, 2001, 2002, 2003, 2004, 2005, 2008).

Teams

Women's

Mixed

Mixed doubles

References

External links

Living people
1979 births
French female curlers
French curling champions